The Very Best of Leo Sayer was a greatest hits compilation album released in May 1979. His seventh album, it was in the #1 spot in the UK Albums Chart for 3 weeks, and in Australia for 1 week. It is his only chart-topper in the UK Albums Chart. It was never released in the United States.

The album is split with the first side featuring his more recent work with producer Richard Perry and side two featuring his earlier work produced by Adam Faith with David Courtney or Russ Ballard.

Side one has seven of the eight UK singles released from 1976–8 (leaving out the non-charting "There Isn't Anything" and also the US only single "Easy to Love"). Side two features five of the six singles released from 1973–5 (with none-charting debut single "Why Is Everybody Going Home" not included). It also includes two album tracks from 1974's Just a Boy LP; "Train" (which was released as a single in 1979 to promote this album in Australia) and his version of the hit he wrote for Roger Daltrey, "Giving It All Away".

Track listing

Side 1
"When I Need You"
"You Make Me Feel Like Dancing"
"Raining in My Heart"
"How Much Love"
"Dancing the Night Away"
"Thunder in My Heart"
"I Can't Stop Loving You (Though I Try)"

Side 2
"One Man Band"
"Giving It All Away"
"Train"
"Let It Be"
"Long Tall Glasses (I Can Dance)"
"Moonlighting"
"The Show Must Go On"

Charts

Weekly charts

Year-end charts

Certifications

References

Leo Sayer albums
1979 greatest hits albums
Chrysalis Records compilation albums